André Joseph Lacroix (born June 5, 1945) is a Canadian former professional ice hockey player in the National Hockey League and the World Hockey Association, and is the WHA's all-time leading career scorer.

Playing career
A centre notable for his playmaking, penalty-killing, and faceoff skill, Lacroix played junior hockey for the Peterborough Petes, leading the league in assists in both the 1964–65 and 1965–66 seasons and in points the latter season.  He then played two seasons for the minor-league Quebec Aces of the AHL, playing brilliantly in the 1968 season before being recalled by the Philadelphia Flyers of the NHL in the spring of 1968.  Paired on a forward line with fellow ex-Quebec wingers Jean-Guy Gendron and Simon Nolet, he was an immediate star, leading the Flyers in scoring in both 1969 and 1970.

After the 1971 season, Lacroix was traded to the Chicago Black Hawks and was dismayed at the change of scenery, playing poorly the next year.  However, in the fall of 1972, the upstart World Hockey Association began play, and he wasted no time returning to Philadelphia and signing with the league's Philadelphia Blazers franchise.  Despite the team going through much tumult and controversy, Lacroix was an immediate star for the squad, leading the WHA in points that season with a 50–74–124 mark.

However, in the offseason, the franchise was transferred to Vancouver, and Lacroix refused to move with the team.  Thus, he was traded to an even shakier team, the New York Golden Blades for the 1974 season.  Again, despite payrolls being missed, ownership folding, and the league moving the team to New Jersey on November 21, as the Jersey Knights, he was a standout, leading the WHA in assists with 80.  That fall, Lacroix was named to Team Canada for the 1974 Summit Series against the Soviet Union, scoring one goal and six assists for seven points in eight games to be the team's fourth-leading scorer. His lone goal was the game-winner in Canada's only win of the series, Game 2 at Maple Leaf Gardens.

The New York-New Jersey team moved yet again for the 1975 to California to become the San Diego Mariners, and Lacroix continued his success.  In that first season in San Diego, he achieved his second league scoring title and racked up 106 assists, the professional record at the time and the only player other than Bobby Orr (who scored 102 assists in 1970 - 71) who had ever reached 100 assists in a single season of professional hockey. This professional record would stand until Wayne Gretzky scored 109 assists in 1980 - 81.  As of 2013, only Orr, Lacroix, Wayne Gretzky, and Mario Lemieux have accumulated 100 assists in a season. Lacroix scored over 100 points the next two seasons with the Mariners as well, before the franchise folded.

It was during this time that Lacroix began to be referred to in broadcasts of the games, as "The Magician".  This was in reference to his ability to make the puck disappear --- and then reappear, like a magician pulling a rabbit out of his hat. The opposing goalie would lose track of the puck, only to have it reappear in his net.

He continued to star in two more seasons before the end of the WHA, for the Houston Aeros in 1978 and the New England Whalers in 1979.  His skills diminishing at last, Lacroix played briefly and respectably for the Whalers after their move to the NHL in the 1980 season (with Gordie Howe and Bobby Hull) before retiring.

Retirement

Lacroix has been involved with hockey since retiring, creating the André Lacroix Power Hockey Academy, and he was the Director of hockey programs at the Oakland Ice Centre until 2005. He provided color commentary for the official Hartford Whalers radio broadcasts for several seasons.

Lacroix currently owns and operates The Pond ice rink in Bainbridge/Auburn Township, Ohio.  The Pond is notable for deriving part of its electrical power from wind turbines located at the rink.

On May 28, 2014, Lacroix was named the head coach of the University School varsity hockey team.

Career records and achievements
 79 goals and 119 assists for 198 points in 325 games in the NHL.
 251 goals and 547 assists for 798 points in 551 games in the WHA.
 Named to the WHA's First All-Star Team in 1973, 1974 and 1975.
 Won the Bill Hunter Trophy as the WHA's leading scorer in 1973 and 1975.
 Scored one hundred points or more in six consecutive seasons, a mark achieved by only six other major professional players.
 The WHA's all-time leader in games played, assists (by nearly two hundred) and points (by over a hundred).
 Fourth all-time in WHA history in goals scored.

Awards
Red Tilson Trophy
In 1965 and 1966 with the Peterborough Petes (OHL)	
 
Eddie Powers Memorial Trophy (MVP):
In 1966 with the Peterborough Petes (OHL)

W.D. (Bill) Hunter Trophy:
In 1973 with the Philadelphia Blazers (WHA)
In 1975 with the San Diego Mariners (WHA)

In 2010, he was elected as an inaugural inductee into the World Hockey Association Hall of Fame.

Career statistics

Regular season and playoffs

International

References

External links
 
Flyers Heroes of the Past: Andre Lacroix

1945 births
Canadian ice hockey centres
Chicago Blackhawks players
Hartford Whalers announcers
Hartford Whalers players
Houston Aeros (WHA) players
Ice hockey people from Quebec
Living people
Montreal Junior Canadiens players
New England Whalers players
Jersey Knights players
New York Golden Blades players
People from Lévis, Quebec
Peterborough Petes (ice hockey) players
Philadelphia Blazers players
Philadelphia Flyers players
San Diego Mariners players